Paukku is a Finnish surname. Notable people with the surname include:

Jorma Paukku (1945–2016), Finnish diplomat
Juho Paukku (born 1986), Finnish tennis player

See also
Donna Paukku, Finnish television series

Finnish-language surnames